El Hadj Malick Niang (born 9 December 1995) is a Senegalese footballer who plays as a forward for US Gorée.

References 

1995 births
Living people
Senegalese footballers
Footballers from Dakar
Senegal international footballers
US Gorée players
Association football forwards